Victoria Sabetai is a member of the Research Centre for Antiquity at the Academy of Athens where she is principally involved with research for the Corpus Vasorum Antiquorum, a project aiming to publish ancient Greek pottery in museums and private collections.

She is a graduate of the University of Cincinnati, 1993.

Selected publications
The Washing Painter. A Contribution to the Wedding and Genre Iconography in the Second Half of the Fifth Century B.C. Ann Arbor: University Microfilms, 1994. Thesis (Ph. D.) University of Cincinnati, 1993.
Corpus Vasorum Antiquorum. Greece, Fascicle 6: Thebes, Archaeological Museum I. Athens: Research Centre for Antiquity of the Academy of Athens, 2001. .
Corpus Vasorum Antiquorum. Greece, Athens, Benaki Museum. Athens: Research Centre for Antiquity of the Academy of Athens, 2006.

References

External links
Attic, Boeotian or Euboean? An orphan skyphos from Rhitsona revisited by Victoria Sabetai.
Ronald M. Burrows and Percy N. Ure in Boeotia, a lecture given at the Ure Museum of Greek Archaeology in 2006.

Living people
Year of birth missing (living people)
University of Cincinnati alumni
Scholars of ancient Greek pottery
Greek women archaeologists